Malabe is a suburb of Colombo in the Colombo District, Sri Lanka. This suburb is a crucial economic centre in Colombo.

Etymology
The name ‘Malabe’, is believed to be derived from the classical Sinhala name  Maha Lahamba, meaning "the large forest".

Industries 

Malabe is the home to the MillenniumIT (known as Millennium Information Technologies or MIT), a Sri Lankan-based information technology firm that specialises in electronic trading systems and a fully owned technology business sector of London Stock Exchange Group, SPAR.

Education 

There is a number of state and private schools in Malabe and there are several private degree-awarding institutes.

Private Higher Education Institutes 

Sri Lanka Institute of Information Technology
CINEC Maritime Campus
Horizon Campus

Schools 

 Malabe Boys Model School
 Sri Rahula Balika Maha Vidyalaya
 Horizon International School
 Sussex International School

Demographics 
Malabe is a Sinhala majority area; there are minor communities belonging to other ethnic groups, such as Moors and Tamils. Malabe has some Buddhist religious places of the Sinhalese belonging to the Theravada school which includes the local branch of the Mahamevnawa Buddhist Monastery

Infrastructure

Transportation 
New Kandy Road from Ethul Kotte to Balummahara via Malabe, Kaduwela, Weliweriya and extending to Kandy along A1 highway.

Other means 

A proposed Multi-modal transport hub is to be constructed to link the city to the Colombo Monorail and BRT. 
Malabe is located near the entrance to the Outer-circular Expressway Kaduwela interchange.

Suburbs 
Kaduwela
Battaramulla
Athurugiriya
Sri Jayawardenapura Kotte
Hokandara

References 

Populated places in Western Province, Sri Lanka